Daşbaşı is a village de jure in the Khojaly District of Azerbaijan, de facto in the Askeran Province of the self-proclaimed Republic of Artsakh.

References 
 

Populated places in Khojaly District